Andy Hartono Tandaputra (born 12 June 1984), also known as Andi Hartono Tandaputra or Andi Hartono, is an Indonesian male badminton player, and now represented Sweden.

Achievements

BWF International Challenge/Series

Men's Doubles

 BWF International Challenge tournament
 BWF International Series tournament
 BWF Future Series tournament

References

External links
 
 
 
 

1984 births
Living people
Sportspeople from Bandung
Indonesian male badminton players
Swedish male badminton players